László Szokolai (born 25 March 1952, in Budapest) is a retired Hungarian footballer who played as a forward.

Honours

 1977–78 Magyar Kupa
 1980–81 Nemzeti Bajnokság I

External links
 
 

1952 births
Living people
Hungarian footballers
Association football midfielders
Győri ETO FC players
Ferencvárosi TC footballers
SK Sturm Graz players
Volán FC players
Hungary international footballers
Footballers from Budapest